Quercus brantii, Brant's oak, is a species of oak native to Western Asia, namely in Iran, Iraq, Syria, and Turkey.

Quercus brantii (covering more than 50% of the Zagros Mountains forest steppe ecoregion) is the most important tree species of the Zagros in Iran.

Iranians use its seed in traditional medicine. Other useful products derived from oaks include fuel wood, charcoal and timber hardwood.

References 

brantii
Trees of Western Asia
Plants described in 1840
Medicinal plants